Lupe Victoria Yolí Raymond (23 December 1936 – 29 February 1992), better known as La Lupe, was a Cuban singer of boleros, guarachas and Latin soul, known for her energetic, sometimes controversial performances. Following the release of her first album in 1961, La Lupe moved from Havana to New York and signed with Tico Records, which marked the beginning of a prolific and successful career in the 1960s and 1970s. She retired in the 1980s due to religious reasons.

Life and career

Early life and first recordings

La Lupe was born in the barrio of San Pedrito in Santiago de Cuba. Her father was a worker at the local Bacardí distillery and a major influence on her early life. In 1954 she participated on a radio program which invited fans to sing imitations of their favorite stars. Lupe escaped from school to sing a bolero of Olga Guillot's, called "Miénteme" (Lie to Me), and won the competition. The family moved to Havana in 1955, where she was enrolled at the University of Havana to become a teacher. She admired Celia Cruz and like her, she graduated from teaching instruction before starting her professional singing career.

Lupe married in 1958 and formed a musical trio with her husband Eulogio "Yoyo" Reyes and another female singer. This group, Los Tropicuba, broke up along with her marriage in 1960. She began to perform her own act at a small nightclub in Havana, La Red (The Net), which had a clientele of distinguished foreigners. She acquired a devoted following, which included Ernest Hemingway, Tennessee Williams, Jean-Paul Sartre, Simone de Beauvoir and Marlon Brando. She recorded her first album, Con el diablo en el cuerpo, in 1960 for Discuba, the Cuban subsidiary of RCA Victor. On the album she was backed by two different groups directed by Felipe Dulzaides and Eddy Gaytán. Her first television appearance on Puerto Rican television caused a stir due to her frenzied, vibrant performance, which reportedly shocked some viewers.

Exile and success
In 1962 she was exiled to México. She approached Celia Cruz and asked for her support to get work, and in turn, Celia recommended her to Mongo Santamaría in New York. In New York City, Lupe performed at a cabaret named La Berraca and started a new career, making more than 10 records in five years. She married a second time, to salsa musician Willie García, with whom she had a son. That marriage also ended in divorce.

Lupe's passionate performances covered the range of music: son montuno, bolero,  boogaloo, venturing into other Caribbean styles like Dominican merengue, Puerto Rican bomba and plena. It was her recordings which brought Tite Curet Alonso into prominence as a composer of tough-minded boleros in the salsa style. For a good part of the 1960s she was the most acclaimed Latin singer in New York City due to her partnership with Tito Puente. She did a wide variety of cover versions in either Spanish or accented English, including "Yesterday",
"Dominique" by The Singing Nun, "Twist & Shout", "Unchained Melody", "Fever" and "America" from West Side Story. Fred Weinberg, who was her favorite audio engineer, and also worked with Celia Cruz, Mongo Santamaria, Tito Puente, and many more of the Latin American greats, and a producer on several of Lupe's albums, called La Lupe "A talent hurricane" in the studio due to her intense singing and enthusiasm.

The quality of her performances became increasingly inconsistent. There were persistent rumors of her drug addiction and her life was "a real earthquake" according to statements of close friends, although Fred Weinberg, who engineered, and also produced a vast amount of her albums, stated that "In all the years I worked with Lupe, not once did I ever see her on drugs, or using drugs...Heck, she  never even drank liquor due to her strong belief in religion." She ended some of her on-stage engagements being treated with an oxygen mask. Although she may have been poorly managed by her label Fania Records in particular, she managed and produced herself in mid-career, after she parted ways with Tito Puente. However, in the late 1960s her ephemeral career went downhill. The explosion of salsa and the arrival of Celia Cruz to New York were the determining factors that sent her into the background and her career declined thereafter.

La Lupe was part of the cast of Two Gentleman of Verona with Raul Julia at the Delacorte Theatre in Central Park which moved to Broadway in December 1971.

Later years and death
A devout follower of Santería, she continued to practice her religion. Her record label Fania Records (which had previously acquired Tico) ended her contract in the late 1970s, keen to instead promote Celia Cruz's career. La Lupe retired in 1980, and found herself destitute by the early 1980s. In 1984, she injured her spine while trying to hang a curtain in her home; she initially used a wheelchair, then later a cane. An electrical fire made her homeless. After being healed at an evangelical Christian crusade, La Lupe abandoned her Santería roots and became a born-again Christian. In 1991, she gave a concert at La Sinagoga in New York, singing Christian songs.

La Lupe died of a heart attack at the age of 55,<ref>Remembering LA LUPE  from Latin Beat Magazine May 2000</ref> and is buried in Saint Raymond's Cemetery in the Bronx.

Discography
Albums
 Con el diablo en el cuerpo (1960, Discuba)
 La Lupe is back 1961
 Mongo Introduces La Lupe 1963
 Tito Puente Swings, The Exciting Lupe Sings 1965 (with Tito Puente)
 Tú y yo 1965 (with Tito Puente)
 Homenaje a Rafael Hernández 1966 (with Tito Puente)
 La Lupe y su alma venezolana 1966
 A mí me llaman La Lupe 1966
 The King and I 1967 (with Tito Puente)
 The Queen does her own thing 1967
 Two Sides of La Lupe 1968
 Queen of Latin Soul 1968
 La Lupe's era 1968
 La Lupe is the Queen 1969
 Definitely La Yi Yi Yi 1969
 That genius called the Queen 1970
 La Lupe en Madrid 1971
 Stop, I'm free again 1972
 ¿Pero cómo va ser? 1973
 Un encuentro con La Lupe – with Curet Alonso 1974
 One of a kind 1977
 La pareja 1978 (with Tito Puente)
 En algo nuevo 1980
 La samaritana 1986
  La Lupe en Cristo 1989

Compilations
This section is not complete.
 Lo mejor de la Lupe Compilation, 1974
 Apasionada Compilation, 1978
 La Lupe: too much 1989. Compilation from Tico recordings only, by Charly Records LP HOT 123
 Dance with the Queen 2008
 La Lupe greatest hits 2008

Hit singles
Short list of her best-known songs, taken from Giro Radamés' Diccionario enciclopédico de la música en Cuba and compilation albums:
 "Con el diablo en el cuerpo"
 "Fiebre"
 "Crazy heart"
 "Qué te pedí?"
 "La tirana" [Tico SLP 1167]
 "Puro teatro" [Tico SLP 1192]
 "Adiós"
 "Carcajada final" [Tico SLP 1176]
 "A Benny Moré [Tico CLP 1310]

Film & theatre 
 La gran tirana by Carlos Padrón-Cuba. 2011 Havanna, 2012: Havanna at Humboldt Haus, Ulm at theater in der westentasche, Theater Tage in Karlsruhe, Kubanische Botschaft in Berlin. Starring: Nancy Calero-Germany.
 La Lupe: my life, my destiny: theatrical production by Carmen Rivera (2001)
 La Lupe: Queen of Latin Soul film by Ela Troyano (2003; 2007)
 La Reina, La Lupe by Rafael Albertori (2003)

In popular culture
Pedro Almodóvar's Women on the Verge of a Nervous Breakdown ends with La Lupe's "Puro Teatro".
 Her recording of La Virgen Lloraba was used in the 1996 film The Birdcage.
 In 2002, New York City renamed East 140th Street in The Bronx as La Lupe Way in her memory.
 Cuban-American writer Daína Chaviano pays homage to La Lupe in the novel The Island of Eternal Love (Riverhead-Penguin, 2008), where the singer appears in a cameo singing Puro Teatro.
 On the TV series RuPaul's Drag Race: All Stars, Puerto Rican drag queen Nina Flowers chose to impersonate La Lupe.
 Her recording of "Fever" was included in the episode "Angels of Death," from season two of the Starz series Magic City.
 A poem by Víctor Hernández Cruz was written about her: "La Lupe".
 In 1991, comedian Sandra Bernhard released a track called "La Lupe" on her album Excuses for Bad Behavior, Part #1, spoken in Spanish and English, in which Bernhard briefly speaks of the dissolution of the La Lupe/Tito Puente relationship.
 In 2015, an analogous and fictionalized version of La Lupe (renamed Lola Calvo for the series), was heavily featured in an 80 episode Spanish-language biographical television series of Celia Cruz called Celia, on the Telemundo network.
 In 2017, the first episode of TNT's Claws is titled "Tirana" and in it the main characters lip-sync and dance to one of La Lupe's signature songs.
In 2002, her song "Que te Pedí" was featured in the film Empire.
La Lupe's signature song, "Que te Pedí", was featured in the 2006 film, El Cantante, starring Marc Anthony as Hector Lavoe.
In 2020, the Colombian singer Kali Uchis, added a cover of "Que te pedi" in her album Sin Miedo (Del amor y otros demonios)

References

Further reading

External links

La Lupe, Queen of Latin Soul site for Independent Lens on PBS

Performances of Pleasure and Pain: Dr Vanessa Knights (pdf)
Unofficial website

1936 births
1992 deaths
American evangelicals
American women singer-songwriters
American entertainers of Cuban descent
Cuban women singers
Cuban songwriters
Fania Records artists
People from Santiago de Cuba
Musicians from the Bronx
Salsa musicians
Converts to Protestantism
Former Santeríans
American soul singers
20th-century American singers
Singer-songwriters from New York (state)
20th-century American women singers
Bolero singers
Guaracha singers
Burials at Saint Raymond's Cemetery (Bronx)
Women in Latin music